Pseudanthonomus is a genus of true weevils in the beetle family Curculionidae. There are more than 60 described species in Pseudanthonomus.

Species
These 63 species belong to the genus Pseudanthonomus:

 Pseudanthonomus apionoides Champion & G.C., 1903
 Pseudanthonomus baryon Clark, 1990
 Pseudanthonomus bellus Hustache, 1930
 Pseudanthonomus boson Clark, 1990
 Pseudanthonomus brunneus Dietz, 1891
 Pseudanthonomus canescens Faust & J., 1893
 Pseudanthonomus carinulatus Faust & J., 1893
 Pseudanthonomus concolor Clark, 1992
 Pseudanthonomus crataegi (Walsh, 1867)
 Pseudanthonomus cretaceus Champion & G.C., 1903
 Pseudanthonomus crinitus Champion, 1910
 Pseudanthonomus curvicrus Champion & G.C., 1903
 Pseudanthonomus dietzi Clark, 1987
 Pseudanthonomus electron Clark, 1990
 Pseudanthonomus facetus Dietz, 1891
 Pseudanthonomus fermion Clark, 1990
 Pseudanthonomus gluon Clark, 1990
 Pseudanthonomus griseipilis Champion & G.C., 1903
 Pseudanthonomus guttatus Champion & G.C., 1903
 Pseudanthonomus hadron Clark, 1990
 Pseudanthonomus hamamelidis Pierce & W.D., 1908
 Pseudanthonomus helvolus (Boheman, 1843)
 Pseudanthonomus hispidus Champion & G.C., 1903
 Pseudanthonomus incipiens Dietz, 1891
 Pseudanthonomus indignus Faust & J., 1893
 Pseudanthonomus inermis Blatchley & Leng, 1916
 Pseudanthonomus krameri Pierce
 Pseudanthonomus krameriae Pierce & W.D., 1908
 Pseudanthonomus lepton Clark, 1990
 Pseudanthonomus lituratus Champion & G.C., 1903
 Pseudanthonomus longulus Dietz, 1891
 Pseudanthonomus meridionalis Champion & G.C., 1903
 Pseudanthonomus meson Clark, 1990
 Pseudanthonomus mixtus Pierce & W.D., 1908
 Pseudanthonomus muon Clark, 1990
 Pseudanthonomus nanus LeConte & J.L., 1896
 Pseudanthonomus neutrino Clark, 1990
 Pseudanthonomus neutron Clark, 1990
 Pseudanthonomus nubilosus Champion & G.C., 1903
 Pseudanthonomus nucleon Clark, 1990
 Pseudanthonomus parton Clark, 1990
 Pseudanthonomus parvulus Dietz, 1891
 Pseudanthonomus photino Clark, 1990
 Pseudanthonomus photon Clark, 1990
 Pseudanthonomus pion Clark, 1990
 Pseudanthonomus positron Clark, 1990
 Pseudanthonomus proton Clark, 1990
 Pseudanthonomus puncticollis Blatchley & Leng, 1916
 Pseudanthonomus pusillus Hustache, 1930
 Pseudanthonomus quark Clark, 1990
 Pseudanthonomus relictus Dietz, 1891
 Pseudanthonomus rufotestaceus Champion & G.C., 1903
 Pseudanthonomus rufulus Dietz, 1891
 Pseudanthonomus selectron Clark, 1990
 Pseudanthonomus seriatus Hustache, 1930
 Pseudanthonomus seriesetosus Dietz, 1891
 Pseudanthonomus seriestosus Dietz
 Pseudanthonomus sylvaticus Hustache, 1930
 Pseudanthonomus tachyon Clark, 1990
 Pseudanthonomus tau Clark, 1990
 Pseudanthonomus tomentosulus Dietz, 1891
 Pseudanthonomus tomentosus Faust & J., 1893
 Pseudanthonomus validus Dietz, 1891 (currant fruit weevil)

References

Further reading

External links

 

Curculioninae
Articles created by Qbugbot